The 2019 Big South Conference baseball tournament was held from May 21 through 25.  The top eight regular season finishers of the conference's ten teams 
met in the double-elimination tournament held at Fayetteville Ballpark in Fayetteville, North Carolina.  The tournament champion, Campbell, earned the conference's automatic bid to the 2019 NCAA Division I baseball tournament.

Seeding and format
The top eight finishers of the league's ten teams qualified for the double-elimination tournament. Teams were seeded based on conference winning percentage, with the first tiebreaker being head-to-head record.

Results

Conference championship

References

Tournament
Big South Conference Baseball Tournament
Big South Conference baseball tournament
Big South Conference baseball tournament